Election Day in Russia was held on September 14, 2014.

Gubernatorial elections 

Altai Krai
Altai Republic
Astrakhan Oblast
Ivanovo Oblast
Kabardino-Balkaria
Kirov Oblast
Komi Republic
Kurgan Oblast
Nenets Autonomous Okrug
Oryol Oblast
Pskov Oblast
Stavropol Krai
Udmurtia
Voronezh Oblast

Regional legislative elections 

Altai Republic
 Republic of Crimea and Sevastopol1
Kabardino-Balkaria
Karachay-Cherkessia
Mari El
Tatarstan
Tuva
Khabarovsk Krai
Bryansk Oblast
Volgograd Oblast
Tula Oblast
2014 Moscow City Duma election
Nenets Autonomous Okrug
1 Internationally recognised as part of Ukraine, see political status of Crimea and 2014 Crimean crisis for details

Local (self-government) mayoral elections

Local (self-government) legislative elections

External links 
 Website of the Central Election Commission of Russia

2014 elections in Russia
Regional elections in Russia
September 2014 events in Russia